The 68th parallel north is a circle of latitude that is 68 degrees north of the Earth's equatorial plane, in the Arctic. It crosses the Atlantic Ocean, Europe, Asia and North America.

At this latitude the sun is visible for 24 hours, 0 minutes during the summer solstice and Civil Twilight during the winter solstice.

This latitude is the boundary between the Southern and Arctic zones of Canada's National Topographic System, at which the longitude span of each map sheet doubles as one crosses this latitude going north.

Around the world
Starting at the Prime Meridian and heading eastwards, the parallel 68° north passes through:

{| class="wikitable plainrowheaders"
! scope="col" width="125" | Co-ordinates
! scope="col" | Country, territory or ocean
! scope="col" | Notes
|-
| style="background:#b0e0e6;" | 
! scope="row" style="background:#b0e0e6;" | Atlantic Ocean
| style="background:#b0e0e6;" | Norwegian Sea
|-
| 
! scope="row" | 
| Moskenesøya, Lofoten, Nordland
|-
| style="background:#b0e0e6;" | 
! scope="row" style="background:#b0e0e6;" | Atlantic Ocean
| style="background:#b0e0e6;" | Vestfjorden, Norwegian Sea
|-
| 
! scope="row" | 
| Engeløya, Nordland
|-
| style="background:#b0e0e6;" | 
! scope="row" style="background:#b0e0e6;" | Atlantic Ocean
| style="background:#b0e0e6;" | Skagstadsundet, Norwegian Sea
|-
| 
! scope="row" | 
| Lundøya and Finnøya, and the mainland Nordland
|-
| style="background:#b0e0e6;" | 
! scope="row" style="background:#b0e0e6;" | Atlantic Ocean
| style="background:#b0e0e6;" | Vestfjorden, Norwegian Sea
|-
| 
! scope="row" | 
| Engeløya, Lundøya and Finnøya, and the mainland Nordland
|-
| style="background:#b0e0e6;" | 
! scope="row" style="background:#b0e0e6;" | Atlantic Ocean
| style="background:#b0e0e6;" | Vestfjorden, Norwegian Sea
|-
| 
! scope="row" | 
| Islands of Engeløya, Lundøya and Finnøya, and the mainland Nordland
|-
| 
! scope="row" | 
| Norrbotten County (Lapland province)
|-
| 
! scope="row" | 
| Nordland, for about 5,8 km
|-
| 
! scope="row" | 
| Norrbotten County (Lapland and Norrbotten provinces) 
|-
| 
! scope="row" | 
| Lapland
|-
| 
! scope="row" | 
| Kola Peninsula, Murmansk Oblast
|-
| style="background:#b0e0e6;" | 
! scope="row" style="background:#b0e0e6;" | Arctic Ocean
| style="background:#b0e0e6;" | White Sea
|-
| 
! scope="row" | 
| Kanin Peninsula, Nenets Autonomous Okrug
|-
| style="background:#b0e0e6;" | 
! scope="row" style="background:#b0e0e6;" | Arctic Ocean
| style="background:#b0e0e6;" | Barents Sea
|-
| 
! scope="row" | 
| Nenets Autonomous OkrugKomi RepublicYamalo-Nenets Autonomous Okrug
|-
| style="background:#b0e0e6;" | 
! scope="row" style="background:#b0e0e6;" | Arctic Ocean
| style="background:#b0e0e6;" | Gulf of Ob, Kara Sea
|-
| 
! scope="row" | 
| Yamalo-Nenets Autonomous Okrug
|-
| style="background:#b0e0e6;" | 
! scope="row" style="background:#b0e0e6;" | Arctic Ocean
| style="background:#b0e0e6;" | Taz Estuary, Kara Sea
|-
| 
! scope="row" | 
| Yamalo-Nenets Autonomous OkrugKrasnoyarsk KraiYakutiaChukotka Autonomous Okrug
|-
| style="background:#b0e0e6;" | 
! scope="row" style="background:#b0e0e6;" | Arctic Ocean
| style="background:#b0e0e6;" | Chukchi Sea
|-
| 
! scope="row" | 
| Alaska 
|-
| 
! scope="row" | 
| Yukon Northwest Territories Nunavut
|-
| style="background:#b0e0e6;" | 
! scope="row" style="background:#b0e0e6;" | Arctic Ocean
| style="background:#b0e0e6;" | Coronation GulfPassing just north of the Couper, Berens and Lawford Islands Passing just north of Hepburn IslandPassing just south of the Jameson Islands
|-
| 
! scope="row" | 
| Nunavut
|-
| style="background:#b0e0e6;" | 
! scope="row" style="background:#b0e0e6;" | Arctic Ocean
| style="background:#b0e0e6;" | Bathurst Inlet
|-
| 
! scope="row" | 
| Nunavut - Chapman Islands
|-
| style="background:#b0e0e6;" | 
| style="background:#b0e0e6;" | Arctic Ocean
| style="background:#b0e0e6;" | Bathurst InletPassing just north of Lewes Island Fishers Island
|-
| 
! scope="row" | 
| Nunavut
|-
| style="background:#b0e0e6;" | 
! scope="row" style="background:#b0e0e6;" | Arctic Ocean
| style="background:#b0e0e6;" | Queen Maud Gulf
|-
| 
! scope="row" | 
| Nunavut - O'Reilly Island, Klutschak Peninsula and Adelaide Peninsula
|-
| style="background:#b0e0e6;" | 
! scope="row" style="background:#b0e0e6;" | Arctic Ocean
| style="background:#b0e0e6;" | Chantrey Inlet
|-
| 
! scope="row" | 
| Nunavut
|-
| style="background:#b0e0e6;" | 
! scope="row" style="background:#b0e0e6;" | Arctic Ocean
| style="background:#b0e0e6;" | Committee Bay
|-
| 
! scope="row" | 
| Nunavut - Wales Island and Melville Peninsula
|-
| style="background:#b0e0e6;" | 
! scope="row" style="background:#b0e0e6;" | Arctic Ocean
| style="background:#b0e0e6;" | Foxe Basin
|-
| 
! scope="row" | 
| Nunavut - Prince Charles Island, Air Force Island and Baffin Island
|-
| style="background:#b0e0e6;" | 
! scope="row" style="background:#b0e0e6;" | Arctic Ocean
| style="background:#b0e0e6;" | Davis Strait
|-
| 
! scope="row" | 
| AvannaataSermersooq
|-
| style="background:#b0e0e6;" | 
! scope="row" style="background:#b0e0e6;" | Atlantic Ocean
| style="background:#b0e0e6;" | Greenland Sea Norwegian Sea
|-
|}

See also
67th parallel north
69th parallel north

n68
Geography of the Arctic